Vladislav Vladimirovich Shevchenko (born 18 June 1940) is a Russian astronomer who specializes in lunar exploration. He is the Head of Department of Lunar and Planetary Research, Sternberg State Astronomical Institute, Moscow State University.

Positions in Professional Organizations: 
1978–present time - Chairman of the Lunar Task Group of the International Astronomical Union's Working Group for Planetary System Nomenclature, member of the Working Group. 
1991-1995 - member of the Task Committee on Lunar Base Structures of American Society of Civil Engineers. 
1978-1997 - Chairman of the Lunar and Mercury Working Group of Astronomical Council, Russian Academy of Sciences. 
1989-1993 - member of International Design for Extreme Environment Association (IDEEA). 
1993-1997 - Editorial Board member of Solar System research (Periodical of Russian Academy of Sciences) . 
1990-1997 - Editorial Board member of The Earth and the Universe (Periodical of Russian Academy of Sciences). 
Member of International Astronomical Union (Commission 16). 
Member of Astronomical society (International). 
Member of International Union of Geodesy and Geophysics. 
Member of COSPAR.

External links
Source: http://selena.sai.msu.ru/Shev/ShevE.htm

Russian astronomers
1940 births
Living people
Academic staff of Moscow State University